Barwari is a region in the Hakkari mountains in northern Iraq and southeastern Turkey. The region is inhabited by Assyrians and Kurds, and was formerly also home to a number of Jews prior to their emigration to Israel in 1951. It is divided between northern Barwari in Turkey, and southern Barwari in Iraq.

Etymology
The name of the region is derived from "berwar" ("slope [of a hill]" in Kurdish).

History
The British archaeologist Austen Henry Layard visited Barwari Bala in 1846 and noted that some villages in the region were inhabited by both Assyrians and Kurds. Assyrians of Barwari Bala were rayah (subjects) of the Kurdish emirate of lower Barwari, whilst Assyrians in Barwari Shwa'uta were partly semi-independent and partly rayah. In the 1840s, a series of massacres of Assyrians in Barwari Bala were perpetrated by Kurdish tribes under the leadership of Bedir Khan Beg, Mir of Bohtan, resulting in the death or expulsion of half of the population. The region was estimated by American Presbyterian missionaries to contain 32 Assyrian villages, with 420 Nestorian families, in 1870.

Amidst the Assyrian genocide in the First World War, in 1915, most Assyrian villages in Barwari Bala were destroyed and their inhabitants slaughtered by Turkish reservists and Kurdish tribesmen led by Rashid Bey, Mir of lower Barwari, whilst the survivors took refuge in the vicinity of Urmia and Salamas in Iran. Assyrian villages in northern Barwari were similarly pillaged and their inhabitants massacred. Until the genocide in 1915, northern Barwari was inhabited by approximately 9000 Assyrians, whilst there were c. 5000 Assyrians in southern Barwari. Survivors were transferred under British protection from Iran to the refugee camp at Baqubah in Iraq in 1918, where they remained until most families attempted to return to their villages in 1920.

As a consequence of the partition of the Ottoman Empire, most of Hakkari was allocated to Turkey, which prevented Assyrians from returning, whilst Assyrians in southern Barwari in Iraq were permitted to return to their original villages. The Assyrians of southern Barwari suffered major upheaval with the eruption of the First Iraqi–Kurdish War in 1961, forcing a sizeable number to flee and seek refuge in Iraqi towns until most returned at the war's conclusion in 1970, during which time a few Assyrian villages were seized and settled by Kurds. In accordance with the 1975 Algiers Agreement between Iraq and Iran, the Iraqi government carried out border clearings in 1977-1978, destroying a number of Assyrian and Kurdish villages, and displacing their population.

Villages that had been spared in the late 1970s were destroyed by the Iraqi Army in the Al-Anfal campaign in 1987-1988, and all Assyrians in the region were moved to refugee camps, from which they moved to Iraqi towns or emigrated abroad to Europe, North America, or Australia. In total, all 82 villages in the sub-district of Barwari Bala were destroyed in the campaign, of which 35 villages were entirely inhabited by Assyrians. Assyrians returned to rebuild their villages after the establishment of the Iraqi no-fly zones in 1991, however, the majority have remained in the diaspora.

Geography

Iraq
Southern or lower Barwari corresponds to the part of the region now located within northern Iraq, and encompasses Barwari Bala and Barwari Žēr. Barwari Bala ("upper Barwari" in Kurdish) is a sub-district in Amadiya District within the Dohuk Governorate, and is located alongside the Iraq–Turkey border. The sub-region of Barwari Bala is separated from the Sapna valley to the south by the Matina mountains, and from the historical region of Lower Tyari in Hakkâri Province in Turkey by the Širani mountains to the north. Its eastern border is defined by the Great Zab, beyond which lies Nerwa Rekan, and the Khabur serves as the western boundary of Barwari Bala. Barwari Žēr ("lower Barwari" in Kurdish) is located further to the south of Barwari Bala.

The following villages in Barwari Bala are currently inhabited by Assyrians:

Tarshīsh
Jdīdā
Beṯ Kolke.
Tūṯā Shamāyā
Māyā
Derishke.
Aïnā d'Nūne
Hayyat
Beṯ Shmiyāye
Dūre
Helwā
Malakṯā
Aqrī.
Beṯ Balōkā
Hayyis
Mūsākān
Merkaje
Qasrka
Baz
Betanure
Sardasht
Cham Dostina
Khwara.
Kani Balavi
Jelek
Iden
Chaqala

The following villages in Barwari Bala were formerly inhabited by Assyrians:

Alqōshtā.
Avsarke.
Bazif.
Beluzan.
Butara.
Dargeli.
Maghribiya.
Tirwanish.

Turkey
The districts of Barwari Sevine, Barwari Shwa'uta, Barwari Qudshanes, and Bilidjnaye were located in southeastern Turkey, and constituted northern or upper Barwari.

The following villages in Barwari Sevine were formerly inhabited by Assyrians:

Ḥardālānīs.
Qōṭrānīs
Aḥwānīs
Shmūnīnīs.
Sīwīne.
Espen
Ṣallan
Qūrānīs.
Karme
Ōret.

The following villages in Barwari Qudshanes were formerly inhabited by Assyrians:

Qūdshānīs
Beṯ Nānō
Nerwā
Tīrqōnīs
Kīgar
Sōrīnes
Tarmel
Beṯ Ḥājīj
Peḥḥen
Chāros

The following villages in Bilidjnaye were formerly inhabited by Assyrians:

Derres.
Āwert
Dāden.
Beṯ Respi
Ālāṣ
Nauberi

The following villages in Barwari Shwa'uta were formerly inhabited by Assyrians:

Shwāwūṯā.
Sāqerran.
Dairikki.

References
Notes

Citations

Bibliography

Assyrian geography
Divided regions
Geography of Kurdistan
Hakkari